Nicklas Andre Porsing (born 7 January 1993) is a Danish speedway rider who has raced in leagues in Denmark, Poland, Sweden and the United Kingdom.

Career
Born in Herning, Porsing started his senior career at Holsted Speedway Klub in Denmark. He finished second in the European Junior Championship and reached the final of the Under-21 World Championship (finishing 5th) in 2012. In 2013 he again reached the final of the Under-21 World Championship and was part of the winning Danish team at the Under-21 World Cup in Pardubice.

In 2013 he was signed mid-season by King's Lynn Stars to ride in the Elite League as cover for the injured Mads Korneliussen and was retained for the 2014 and 2015 seasons. He returned to Lynn towards the end of the 2016 season and remains in the team for 2017.

He signed for ZKS Ostrovia's second division team in 2013 and has stayed with the club, signing again to ride in the Speedway Ekstraliga in 2015.

References

Living people
Danish speedway riders
King's Lynn Stars riders
1993 births
People from Herning Municipality
Sportspeople from the Central Denmark Region